Horse Barn may refer to:

Horse Barn (Nampa, Idaho), listed on the National Register of Historic Places in Canyon County, Idaho
Horse Barn (Bryce Canyon, Utah), listed on the National Register of Historic Places in Garfield County, Utah